The mole snake (Pseudaspis cana) is a species of snake. It has been placed in the family Lamprophiidae, and more recently in the family Pseudaspididae, along with the genus Pythonodipsas. It is native to much of southern Africa, and is the only member of the genus Pseudaspis. A study showed that P. cana is caught and consumed by the honey badger, among other species. Remains of the mole snake were found in the faeces, and suggest the consumed individuals were larger specimens.

Taxonomy
P. cana was originally described by Carl Linnaeus in his landmark 1758 10th edition of Systema Naturae. Its original binomial name was Coluber cana. Since then, it has also been called Coronella cana by André Marie Constant Duméril, Gabriel Bibron and Auguste Duméril in 1854, before being reclassified as Pseudaspis cana by Edward Drinker Cope in 1864. P. cana is the only species in genus Pseudaspis. The genus has been placed in the family Lamprophiidae. More recently it has been placed in the family Pseudaspididae, along with the genera Buhoma and Pythonodipsas, although a 2019 study concluded that the status of Pseudaspididae "deserves to be viewed with caution", and Buhoma may not belong in the family.

Description
A small head and pointed snout are characteristics of the species. It has a firm, tubular body. Like the majority of the Lamprophiidae, P. cana is not venomous.

In mature individuals, the body is mostly one colour, and may vary from yellow to brown to grey, and in some cases, solid black. The young have dark markings and spots that are gradually lost as the individual ages. Colour may be related to geography; in the south, most specimens are black, whereas specimens found in the northern part of their range are brown, reddish-brown, grey, or yellow.

Diet
The primary food source of P. cana is golden moles (hence the common name), rodents, and other small mammals. For this reason, it is considered useful for the natural control of problem rodents.

Its diet may also include the eggs of seafowl. At Robben Island, mole snakes were observed eating the eggs of Spheniscus demersus (African penguin), Larus hartlaubii (Harlaub's gull), and Numida meleagris (helmeted guinea-fowl). Juveniles were observed eating Strongylopus grayii (clicking stream frogs).

The mole snake is a nest predator of the Karoo prinia (Prinia maculosa). P. cana is one of at least six snake species which cause reproductive loss and decrease of nest success in P. maculosa.

Distribution and habitat
The range of the mole snake encompasses most of southern Africa. P. cana is common in Kalahari Gemsbok National Park. It is widely distributed, with a range stretching from Angola in the north to Kenya in the east to South Africa.

The mole snake lives in the abandoned burrows of other animals. It can be found in a variety of habitats, such as the scrublands of the South African Cape and the Highveld plateaux and grasslands. It has also been found in mountainous and desert areas.

Reproduction
The mole snake is viviparous, mating takes place in late spring (October), and the female gives birth to usually between 25 and 50 young, with as many as 95 possible. The young snakes are 20 to 30 cm in length at birth.

In captivity
The mole snake can be "quite ferocious". Though not venomous, they can cause severe bite wounds. Despite this, they are said to make good pets when sufficiently settled.

Gallery

References

 

Snakes of Africa
Reptiles of South Africa
Monotypic snake genera
Reptiles described in 1758
Taxa named by Carl Linnaeus
Pseudaspididae